Curtis-Crumb Farm is a historic home and farm complex located at Hilton in Monroe County, New York. The farmhouse was constructed in about 1845 and is a modest example of the rural Greek Revival style.  The property also includes a carriage house, a hog pen, a smoke house, a corn crib, a  stone wall, a cedar split-rail fence, and the remaining  of the original  farm.

It was listed on the National Register of Historic Places in 1997.

References

Houses on the National Register of Historic Places in New York (state)
Greek Revival houses in New York (state)
Houses completed in 1845
Houses in Monroe County, New York
National Register of Historic Places in Monroe County, New York
1845 establishments in New York (state)